The Department of Civil Aviation (DCA) is the governing body which oversees aviation activities in Dubai, United Arab Emirates.

History
The DCA was once the operator of Dubai International Airport, Dubai Cargo Village and Dubai Duty Free Zone. Management of Dubai's airports and cargo gateways have been transferred to Dubai Airports Company, a separate entity from the Department of Civil Aviation. With this restructuring, the scope of the Department of Civil Aviation's activities have been narrowed to aviation regulations and permissions. Ahmed bin Saeed Al Maktoum is the president of the Department of Civil Aviation.

References

External links

 Department of Civil Aviation

Civil aviation authorities in Asia
Government agencies of Dubai
Civil aviation in the United Arab Emirates
Transport organisations in Dubai